The Supermarine Type 553 was a British Mach 2 research aircraft project from 1953 that never proceeded beyond the initial proposal.

Design and development
The difficulty of achieving Mach 2 flight was realised during the development of the 545, which led to Vickers-Supermarine proposing the 553 with a swept wing that would reduce aerodynamic drag. It was to have been built using aluminium alloy which limited the top speed, and the Air Ministry wanted a twin engine design in which alternative engines could readily be installed, and 553 development was abandoned. Lack of endurance was also cited as a problem. The Bristol 188 was developed instead.

Specifications (Supermarine Type 553)

See also

References

Citations

Bibliography

Type 553